The 1959 Davis Cup was the 48th edition of the Davis Cup, the most important tournament between national teams in men's tennis. 27 teams entered the Europe Zone, 8 teams entered the Eastern Zone, and 7 teams entered the America Zone. The Europe Zone was modified so that only the previous year's semifinalists were guaranteed first round byes, allowing more countries to compete. Colombia made its first appearance in the tournament.

Australia defeated Cuba in the Americas Inter-Zonal final, India defeated the Philippines in the Eastern Zone final, and Italy defeated Spain in the Europe Zone final. In the Inter-Zonal Zone, Australia defeated Italy in the semifinal, and then defeated India in the final. In the Challenge Round Australia defeated the defending champions the United States. The final was played at the West Side Tennis Club in Forest Hills, New York, United States on 28–31 August.

America Zone

North & Central America Zone

South America Zone

Americas Inter-Zonal Final
Australia vs. Cuba

Eastern Zone

Draw

Final
India vs. Philippines

Europe Zone

Draw

Final
Italy vs. Spain

Inter-Zonal Zone

Draw

Semifinals
Australia vs. Italy

Final
Australia vs. India

Challenge Round
United States vs. Australia

References

External links
Davis Cup official website

 
Davis Cups by year
Davis Cup
Davis Cup
Davis Cup
Davis Cup
Davis Cup
Davis Cup